After the Deluge is a 2003 Australian television miniseries starring Ray Barrett, David Wenham, Hugo Weaving and Samuel Johnson. It was first broadcast by Channel Ten in two parts in June 2003.

Cast
 David Wenham – Alex Kirby
 Hugo Weaving – Martin 'Marty' Kirby
 Samuel Johnson – Toby Kirby
 Aden Young – Young Cliff
 Ray Barrett – Old Cliff Kirby
 Catherine McClements – Nikki Kirby
 Essie Davis – Beth
 Rachel Griffiths – Annie
 Kate Beahan – Margaret
 Vince Colosimo – Eric
 Marta Dusseldorp – Eva
 Bob Franklin – Sid
Marco Chiappi – Bevan
 Simon Burke – Michael
 Tara Morice – Dianne 
 Emily Browning – Maddy
 Dominic Smith - Schoolboy

Story
Cliff, a former music teacher, is stricken with alzheimers and is living in a nursing home. His three sons, with whom he has had a difficult, at times estranged, relationship, are all struggling with their lives and their roles in a post-feminist world. The eldest son, Martin is a fading former rock n roll star but he is still clinging to his musical dreams. The middle son, Alex, has a successful career and a middle-class lifestyle but his marriage is crumbling. Toby, the youngest and gentlest of the three, wants to have the perfect family and he alone is making an effort to stay connected with his own father.

The dementia-stricken Cliff relives his past, first as a talented young musician who falls in love with the equally talented Margaret but their promising careers and love affair are both cut short by the advent of the Second World War. An army officer in Singapore during the Japanese invasion, Cliff is saved from death by a Welsh Sergeant named Sid who sacrifices his own life but the former then has to endure years of captivity. Returning to Australia, Cliff discovers Margaret, thinking he was lost, has married another man. Cliff becomes a school-teacher, marries a co-worker and they have three sons. However the marriage is a strained one as Cliff, traumatised by the war, feeling trapped by his obligations as a family man and unhappy over losing Margaret and his chances at a music career, begins to take out his resentment on his family.

Alex's wife leaves him and the stress affects his performance at work. Martin's attempts to restart his music career fail whilst Toby and his wife struggle to start a family. Through flashbacks, it is revealed that Margaret re-appeared in Cliff's life, offering to restart their relationship but Cliff gives up his last chance of true love by choosing to remain with his sons, a sacrifice that his sons will never know.

Alex quits the firm he works for and goes solo, becoming much happier in the process, relishing the time he gets to spend with his own children. Martin accepts that his youth and his dreams are over and he instead embraces the present and a new relationship, managing to re-connect with his father also. Toby's wife manages to fall pregnant and in his utter joy, he realises he will be a far better parent to his child than his own father ever was.

In the nursing home, Cliff is visited by a vision of Sid. Cliff apologises to Sid for not achieving his dreams but Sid points out that he managed to raise three fine boys. Cliff smiles for the first time. Imagining he is back on a sinking ship during the war, Cliff leaves his room and drowns himself in the nursing home's indoor swimming pool.

Awards
 AFI Awards
Best Actress in a Supporting or Guest Role in a Television Drama or Comedy – Essie Davis
Best Telefeature or Mini-Series – Richard Keddie, Andrew Knight, Andrew Wiseman
Best Direction in Television – Brendan Maher
Best Actor in a Supporting or Guest Role in a Television Drama or Comedy – Samuel Johnson (nominated)
Best Actor in a Leading Role in a Television Drama or Comedy – Ray Barrett (nominated)
Best Screenplay in Television – Andrew Knight (nominated)
Open Craft Award – Television – Cezary Skubiszewski For original music (nominated)
Young Actor's Award – Emily Browning (nominated)
 Logie Awards 2004
Most Outstanding Actor in a Drama Series – Ray Barrett
Most Outstanding Actor in a Drama Series – David Wenham 
 ARIA Music Awards 2003
Best Original Soundtrack Album – Cezary Skubiszewski (nominated)
 AWGIE Awards 2003
Television – Mini-Series – Original – Andrew Knight 
 Australian Cinematographers Society – Golden Tripod 2004
Telefeatures, TV Drama & Mini Series – Geoff Burton

References

External links
 

2003 television films
2003 films
Australian drama television films
Films set in Australia
Australian romantic drama films